Do not confuse with John Salerne (died 1410)

John Salerne (died 1415) of Rye and Leigh in Iden, Sussex, was an English politician.

He was a Member (MP) of the Parliament of England for Rye in 1372, 1373 and 1391, and for Hastings in 1378, May 1382, February 1383 and October 1383.

References

14th-century births
1415 deaths
English MPs 1372
People from Rye, East Sussex
English MPs 1373
English MPs 1391
English MPs 1378
English MPs May 1382
English MPs February 1383
English MPs October 1383